The third season of the Attack on Titan anime television series was produced by IG Port's Wit Studio, chief directed by Tetsurō Araki and directed by Masashi Koizuka, with Yasuko Kobayashi handling series composition and Kyōji Asano providing character designs. It covers the "Uprising" (chapters 51–70) and "Return to Shiganshina" (chapters 71–90) arcs from the original manga by Hajime Isayama. The season's first 12 episodes were broadcast on NHK General TV from July 23 to October 15, 2018, before going into hiatus until April 29, 2019. Adult Swim began airing Funimation's English dub on August 18, 2018.

The season follows Eren and his fellow soldiers from the Survey Corps who are still fighting for their survival against the terrifying Titans. However, threats arise not only from the Titans beyond the walls, but from the humans within them as well. After being rescued from the Colossal and Armored Titans, all seems well for the soldiers, until the government suddenly demands custody of Eren and Historia. Sought after by the government, Levi and his new squad must evade their adversaries in hopes of keeping Eren and Historia safe.
In the second half of the season, the Survey Corps led by Erwin embark on a mission to retake Wall Maria, returning to the tattered Shiganshina District that was once Eren's home. The Survey Corps strive to carve a path towards victory as Eren vows to take back everything that was once his.

The score is composed by Hiroyuki Sawano. The opening theme for the second part of third season is  performed by Linked Horizon and the second ending theme is "Name of Love" performed by Cinema Staff.

The season was universally acclaimed, with both parts receiving an equal amount of praise. Part 1 was praised for its story development, and characters especially through Levi and the introduction of Kenny; whilst Part 2 was praised for its emotional moments, action sequences, stakes, animation, dark tone, music, and voice acting.


Episode list

Music
Sawano once again returned as composer. The soundtrack was released on June 26, 2019. As with the second season's soundtrack, music featured in compilation films and OVAs released between season two and three was included in the soundtrack. Vocals were provided by Laco, David Whitaker, Gemie, Eliana, mpi and yosh.

Track listing

Home media release

Japanese

English

Notes

References

External links
  

Attack on Titan episode lists
2018 Japanese television seasons
2019 Japanese television seasons